Elton is both a surname and a male given name. The name likely originates from the Old English name Ella or Elli, and the Old English term 'tun', meaning ‘enclosure’, or ‘settlement’. Elton is a common place name in England.

Notable people with the name include:

Surname
 Sir Arthur Elton, 7th Baronet (1818–1883), English politician
 Sir Arthur Elton, 10th Baronet (1906–1973), English pioneer in documentaries
 Ben Elton (born 1959), English comedian
 Charles Abraham Elton (1778–1853), English soldier and author
 Charles Isaac Elton (1839–1900), English lawyer, politician, writer and antiquarian
 Charles Sutherland Elton (1900–1991), English biologist
 Ed Elton (born 1939), American economist
 Sir Edmund Elton, 8th Baronet (1846–1920)
 Frederick Cockayne Elton (1832–1888), British officer, received the Victoria Cross
 Geoffrey Elton (1921–1994), German-born British historian
 Harry Elton (1930–2004), Canadian television producer
 John Elton (died 1751), English shipbuilder and seaman, adventurer in Persia
 Kim Elton (born 1948), American politician
 Lewis Elton (1923–2018), German-born British researcher into higher education
 Oliver Elton (1861–1945), English literary scholar
 Richard Elton (born c. 1610), English soldier and writer
 Todd Elton (born 1993), Australian rules footballer
 William Elton (1847–1903), English comedian in US and Australia

Given name

Musicians and hosts
 Elton Dean (1945–2006), English saxophonist
 Elton (comedian) (born 1971), German comedian and host of Elton.tv
 Elton Britt (1913–1972), stage name of James Elton Baker, American country music singer-songwriter
 Elton John (born 1947), English musician
 Elton Ibrahimov (born 1994), Azerbaijani singer and dancer 
 Elton Anderson, American singer
 Elton Hayes (1915-2001), British actor and guitarist
 Elton Ahi (born 1964), Persian music producer

Athletes (association football)
 Elton Acolatse (born 25 July 1995), Dutch professional footballer
 Elton Basriu (born 3 August 1987 in Elbasan), Albanian footballer 
 Elton Calé (born 12 July 1988), Brazilian footballer
 Elton Çeno (born 19 June 1976), Albanian retired football player
 Elton da Costa (born 15 December 1979), Brazilian footballer
 Elton Doku (born 1 October 1986), Albanian footballer
 Elton Figueiredo (born 1986), Brazilian footballer
 Elton Hobson (1924-2020), Canadian football player
 Elton John (footballer) (born 1987), Trinidadian footballer
 Elton Kabangu (born 8 February 1998), Belgian professional footballer 
 Elton Junior Melo Ataíde (born 1990), Brazilian footballer
 Elton Monteiro (born 22 February 1994), Portuguese footballer
 Elton Morelato| (born 1990), Brazilian footballer
 Elton Muçollari (born 14 September 1980), Albanian retired footballer
 Elton Ngwatala (born 1993), French professional footballer
 Élton Rodrigues Brandão (born 1 August 1985), Brazilian footballer
 Élton Lexandro de Oliveira Santos (born 15 August 1985), Brazilian retired footballer
 Elton Aparecido de Souza (born May 1985), Brazilian footballer
 Elton Taylor (1932-1997), Canadian football player
 Elton Vata (born 13 April 1998), Albanian footballer
 Elton Williams (footballer) (born 4 July 1973), Guyanese-born Montserratian international football player

Athletes (other sports)
 Elton Flatley (born 1977), Australian former international rugby union footballer
 Elton Patterson (born 1981), former professional gridiron football defensive end
 Elton Tsang (born 1980), Chinese Canadian poker player 
 Elton Julian (born 1974), American professional racing driver
 Elton Rasmussen (1937–1978), Australian rugby league footballer
 Elton Sawyer (born 1959), American NASCAR driver
 Elton Welsby (born 1951), English television sports presenter
 Elton Williams (cricketer) (born 19 September 1973), South African cricketer
 Elton Plummer (1914-1988), Australian rules footballer
 Elton Rynearson (1893-1967), American athlete, coach, and college athletics administrator
 Elton Brand (born 1979), American former professional basketball player and current general manager of Philadelphia 76ers
 Elton Brown (born 1982), American former professional football player 
 Elton Veals (born 1961), American former football player
 Elton Wieman (1896-1971), American football collegiate player, coach and athletic director
 Elton Dharry (born 1985), Guyanese professional boxer

Other
 Elton Bennett (1910–1974), American artist
 Elton Bomer (born 1935), American politician
 Elton Gallegly (born 1944), American politician
 Elton Mayo (1880–1949), Australian psychologist and sociologist
 Elton Bryson Stephens Sr. (1911–2005), American businessman and philanthropist 
 Elton Mangoma, Zimbabwean politician
 Elton Georges (1943-2018), British Virgin Islander politician and businessman
 Elton Gissendanner (born 1927), American politician
 Elton Engstrom Sr. (1905-1963), American businessman and politician
 Elton Fax (1909-1993), American illustrator, cartoonist and author
 Elton Rule (1917-1990), American television executive and former president of the American Broadcasting Company
 Elton Glaser, American poet
 Elton L. Daniel, historian and Iranologist
 Elton N. Kaufmann (born 1943), American materials scientist
 Elton Redalen (1926-2009), American farmer and politician
 Elton D. Aberle, American animal scientist
 Elton Engstrom Jr. (1935-2013), American lawyer, businessman, writer and politician
 Elton Raymond Shaw (1886–1955), American author and churchman
 Elton Joe Kendall (born 1954), American judge

See also
Alton (given name)
Alton (surname)
Helton (name), a similar name

Albanian masculine given names
English masculine given names